The following is a list of the 21 cantons of the Aisne department, in France, following the French canton reorganisation which came into effect in March 2015:

 Bohain-en-Vermandois
 Château-Thierry
 Chauny
 Essômes-sur-Marne
 Fère-en-Tardenois
 Guise
 Hirson
 Laon-1
 Laon-2
 Marle
 Ribemont
 Saint-Quentin-1
 Saint-Quentin-2
 Saint-Quentin-3
 Soissons-1
 Soissons-2
 Tergnier
 Vervins
 Vic-sur-Aisne
 Villeneuve-sur-Aisne
 Villers-Cotterêts

References